Pedro Munitis Álvarez (born 19 June 1975) is a Spanish retired footballer who played mainly as a forward, currently a manager.

He was one of the shortest players in La Liga, and was best known for his fighting spirit. His professional career was mainly associated with Racing de Santander – he also represented Real Madrid for two years – and he played 447 top-flight matches over 17 seasons, scoring 43 goals.

A Spain international in the late 1990s/early 2000s, Munitis represented the country at Euro 2000.

Playing career

Club
Born in Santander, Cantabria, Munitis played in three separate periods for hometown Racing de Santander. He first appeared with its first team on 22 January 1995, in a 0–0 home draw against Real Sociedad.

After a loan to CD Badajoz (Segunda División) and scoring 14 goals in 72 league games with Racing from 1998 to 2000, Munitis attracted attention from La Liga giants Real Madrid, who signed him for £6.8 million. He was relatively used in his two-year spell at the capital club, helping it to one league and the 2001–02 UEFA Champions League.

Munitis spent the 2002–03 season on loan at Racing Santander, notably netting (and celebrating) against Real Madrid in a 2–0 home win on 19 October 2002. In the following off-season, he was purchased up by Deportivo de La Coruña on a free transfer; after a poor first year he would be one of the Galicia side's most important attacking players, also being used as a left winger in order to provide rest for veteran captain Fran and being his replacement when he retired at the end of 2004–05.

Munitis returned to Racing in July 2006, forming an interesting attacking partnership with gigantic Serbian Nikola Žigić in his debut campaign and helping it achieve a first ever qualification to the UEFA Cup in his second. On 19 April 2009 he played his 200th league match for the club, at RCD Espanyol.

In 2009–10, the 34-year-old Munitis was again an undisputed starter, but did not manage to find the net in 29 appearances, and his season was over during a 3–1 home victory over Espanyol due to a knee injury, on 14 April 2010; at that time he ranked second in assists, only trailing FC Barcelona's Lionel Messi.

On 17 October 2010, after more than one year without scoring, Munitis netted from 30 metres for the only goal of the home fixture against UD Almería. During the season, he again featured prominently in the starting XI under both Miguel Ángel Portugal and his successor Marcelino García Toral, the latter returned to the Campos de Sport de El Sardinero after nearly three years. In the following campaign he failed to score in 32 matches, and Racing returned to the second tier after one decade, with the player announcing shortly after his decision to leave his main club.

International
Munitis earned 21 caps for Spain, scoring two goals. He represented the nation at UEFA Euro 2000, appearing as a substitute and netting in a 4–3 group stage win over Yugoslavia and starting in the quarter-final loss to France (1–2).

Munitis' debut came on 27 March 1999 in a Euro 2000 qualifier against Austria, playing 30 minutes in a 9–0 thrashing in Valencia.

International goals

Coaching career
Still not having announced his retirement, Munitis began his managerial career, with women's football club SD Reocín. In 2014 he was appointed at Club Bansander, taking charge of the youth squads.

Munitis returned to Racing on 3 March 2015, being appointed assistant manager along with former teammate Gonzalo Colsa. After their relegation, he took the reins of the team in Segunda División B and won the group, but left in June 2016 following elimination by Cádiz CF in the playoffs.

On 17 October 2016, Munitis succeeded Manolo Herrero as manager of newly relegated SD Ponferradina, with Colsa as his assistant. He resigned five months later with the team lying in sixth in division three, having won exactly a third of his games.

Munitis returned to third-tier management on 26 March 2018, when he was hired by UCAM Murcia CF until the end of the season. Despite missing his objective of a play-off place, he was given another year in the job. He was dismissed on 29 April 2019 with the team still in contention for the play-offs with three rounds to go, and replaced by Juan Merino.

On 4 February 2020, Munitis succeeded Mehdi Nafti at Badajoz, where he had played over two decades ago. After the season was truncated by the COVID-19 pandemic, the team lost in the playoff semi-finals on penalties to FC Barcelona B. He left on his own terms in October, shortly before the start of the new campaign.

Munitis was appointed at CE Sabadell FC of the Primera División RFEF on 23 November 2021, until the end of the season and with the option of another year. He took the team out of the relegation zone and challenged for the play-offs until the penultimate round of fixtures; in June he left after turning down a contract renewal.

Managerial statistics

Honours
Real Madrid
La Liga: 2000–01
UEFA Champions League: 2001–02

See also
List of La Liga players (400+ appearances)

References

External links

1975 births
Living people
Spanish footballers
Footballers from Santander, Spain
Association football forwards
La Liga players
Segunda División players
Tercera División players
Rayo Cantabria players
Racing de Santander players
CD Badajoz players
Real Madrid CF players
Deportivo de La Coruña players
UEFA Champions League winning players
Spain international footballers
UEFA Euro 2000 players
Spanish football managers
Segunda División B managers
Primera Federación managers
Racing de Santander managers
SD Ponferradina managers
UCAM Murcia CF managers
CD Badajoz managers
CE Sabadell FC managers